Machinga is a district in the Southern Region of Malawi. The capital is Machinga. The district covers an area of 3,771 km.² and has a population of 369,614.

Demographics
At the time of the 2018 Census of Malawi, the distribution of the population of Machinga District by ethnic group was as follows:
 57.8% Yao
 27.5% Lomwe
 6.4% Chewa
 5.4% Nyanja
 0.9% Ngoni
 0.7% Mang'anja
 0.7% Sena
 0.3% Tumbuka
 0.0% Nkhonde
 0.0% Lambya
 0.0% Sukwa
 0.1% Others

Government and administrative divisions

There are seven National Assembly constituencies in Machinga:

 Machinga - Central
 Machinga - Central East
 Machinga - East
 Machinga - Likwenu
 Machinga - North East
 Machinga - South
 Machinga - South East

Since the 2009 general election most of these constituencies (except Machinga Central and Machinga Likwenu, which have been held by members of the Democratic Progressive Party) have been represented by politicians from the United Democratic Front.

References

Districts of Malawi
Districts in Southern Region, Malawi